Shooting at the 2014 Summer Youth Olympics was held from 17 to 22 August at the Fangshan Sports Training Base in Nanjing, China.

Qualification 

Each National Olympic Committee (NOC) can enter a maximum of 4 athletes, 1 per each event. As hosts, China is given a spot to compete in boys’ 10 m air pistol and girls’ 10 m air rifle events and a further 24, 6 in each event will be decided by the Tripartite Commission. The remaining 54 places shall be decided by qualification events, namely five continental qualification tournaments.

To be eligible to participate at the Youth Olympics athletes must have been born between 1 January 1996 and 31 December 1999. Furthermore, all shooters must have achieved the following Minimum Qualification Score (MQS).

 Boys 10 m Air Rifle: 60 Shots, Score of 552
 Boys 10 m Air Pistol: 60 Shots, Score of 540
 Girls 10 m Air Rifle: 40 Shots, Score of 368
 Girls 10 m Air Pistol: 40 Shots, Score of 355

The MQS must be achieved between 1 April 2013 and 8 June 2014 at an ISSF registered event.

Summary

10m Air Rifle

10m Air Pistol

Schedule
The competition schedule was released by the ISSF.

All times are CST (UTC+8)

Medal summary

Medal table

10m Air Rifle

10m Air Pistol

References

External links
Official Results Book – Shooting

 
2014 Summer Youth Olympics events
Youth Summer Olympics
2010
Shooting competitions in China